Julie A. Dabrusin  (born April 16, 1971) is a Canadian Liberal politician. She was elected to represent the riding of Toronto—Danforth in the House of Commons of Canada in the 2015 federal election.

Dabrusin earned university degrees in law and Middle Eastern studies. She then spent 13 years as an attorney with Rogers Partners LLP, as well as a year as commission counsel to an inquiry into government procurement. She and her family moved to the Danforth area in 1998. In 2011 she left her legal career to focus on raising her two daughters and participating in various community organizing and charitable activities aimed at promoting and preserving Toronto's public parks. In 2013, she was a recipient of the Queen Elizabeth II Diamond Jubilee Medal.

She was nominated as the Liberal Party candidate in Toronto—Danforth for the 2015 federal election, running primarily on concerns about income inequality and government neglect of Canada's urban areas.  Dabrusin won the election, unseating NDP incumbent Craig Scott. Toronto—Danforth was previously held by NDP leader Jack Layton and was considered to be a safe seat; it has long been one of the more left-leaning ridings in Toronto.

Early life
Dabrusin comes from a Jewish family.

Electoral record

References

External links

 Official website

1971 births
Living people
Anglophone Quebec people
Liberal Party of Canada MPs
Members of the House of Commons of Canada from Ontario
Women members of the House of Commons of Canada
Jewish Canadian politicians
Jewish women politicians
Politicians from Montreal
Politicians from Toronto
People from Old Toronto
Lawyers from Montreal
Lawyers in Ontario
Women in Ontario politics
Canadian women lawyers
21st-century Canadian politicians
21st-century Canadian women politicians